Cherkovna is a village in Northern Bulgaria. The village is located in Targovishte Municipality, Targovishte Province. Аccording to the numbers provided by the 2020 Bulgarian census, Cherkovna currently has a population of 646 people with a permanent address registered in the settlement.

Geography 
Cherkovna village is located in Municipality Targovishte. There is a point in Antarctica, Barilari Bay, Graham Coast, called after the village Cherkovna.

The village is located in the geographical area Gerlovo, 4 kilometers away South from dam Cherkovna.

The elevation of the village ranges between 300 and 499 meters with an average elevation of 351 meters above sea level. The village's climate is continental.

Buildings and infrastructure 
There are three main roads that stem from the village toward Koprets (3.5 km), Strazha (6 km) and Vardun (4 km).

The active buildings in the village are.

 The local community hall and library “Svetlina” was built in 1927 and is still acting.

Ethnicity 
According to the Bulgarian population census in 2011.

References 

Villages in Targovishte Province